Beni-Israel' or Beni Israel may refer to:

 Bene Israel, in India
 Beni Israel Cemetery in Kansas, USA

See also:
 B'nai Israel (disambiguation)